Yunesi Rural District is a rural district (dehestan) in Yunesi District, Bajestan County, Razavi Khorasan Province, Iran. At the 2006 census, its population was 2,825, in 731 families.  The rural district has 15 villages.

References 

Rural Districts of Razavi Khorasan Province
Bajestan County